Hoover House may refer to:

Australia
Hoover House, a home of President Herbert Hoover in Gwalia, Western Australia

Canada
Christian K. Hoover House, a historic house museum in Markham, Ontario
Hoover House, a historic building in Toronto, Ontario

United States
Lou Henry Hoover House, a home of President Herbert Hoover in Stanford, California
Eli Hoover House and Confectionary, Muncie, Indiana, listed on the National Register of Historic Places
Herbert Hoover National Historic Site, West Branch, Iowa
Hoover House (Nicholasville, Kentucky), listed on the National Register of Historic Places in Jessamine County, Kentucky
Shuford–Hoover House, Blackburn, North Carolina, listed on the National Register of Historic Places
Barnet–Hoover Log House, Green Township, Ohio, listed on the National Register of Historic Places in Wayne County, Ohio
Thomas Benton Hoover House, a historic house in Fossil, Oregon
Hoover–Minthorn House, a childhood home of President Herbert Hoover in Newberg, Oregon
Alexander Hoover House, Hoover, South Dakota, listed on the National Register of Historic Places
Hoover House, a historic house in Hoover, Alabama
Hoover House, a landmark house in Riverside, California
Hoover House, a residence hall at the University of Chicago